Richard Bawden (born 1936) is an English painter, printmaker and designer with a graphic, linear quality. His work includes book illustration, murals, etched glass church windows and doors, posters, mosaic and furniture.

His work is in the collections of London Transport, the Tate Gallery and V&A Museum.

He is the son of artist Edward Bawden and is based in Suffolk.

References

1936 births
Living people
Alumni of the Royal College of Art
British illustrators
British male painters
Artists from Suffolk
British printmakers